Sampark Foundation is an Indian non-governmental organization that focuses on primary education.

History
Sampark Foundation was founded in 2005 by Vineet and Anupama Nayar, Vineet serves as the organization's founder chairman. The NGO was developed with the goal of making eighty percent of Indian children proficient at basic math and knowledgeable of five hundred English words after a year of instruction.Based in New Delhi, India, it is funded by a $100 million endowment that expires in 2025, when ownership of the organization's programs will transfer to government stakeholders and all funds of the trust will have been spent.

Programs
The charity began distributing the Sampark Didi, an audio gadget pre-loaded with lessons based on children's stories, in 2016. The gadgets emphasise instruction in both English and Math, which are taught in a combination of English and Hindi. As of 2021 the Sampark Organization has facilitated the education for ten million students across 84,000 schools,  training 500,000 teachers to use the aids. Lessons are taught over 120 days in two hour daily increments. This schedule accommodates children in rural areas who only attend school for part of the year and often only for lunch. Devices are also mandated to be used only at schools and not in the home to encourage in-person attendance. Sampark Foundation has launched an app—Baithak—with a free learning and development platform in Hindi. The platform will provide education to about children across India, and is across states which have partnered with Sampark Foundation - Himachal Pradesh, Haryana, Uttar Pradesh, Chhattisgarh, Jharkhand and Uttarakhand. This platform followed rapid development and testing process over 5 weeks and was anchored by the core team at Sampark Innovation Lab.

References

2005 establishments in Delhi
Non-profit organisations based in India
Organizations established in 2005